City on Fire (喋血城市) is a 1993 Taiwanese action film, directed by Chow Cheung.

Cast
 Michiko Nishiwaki as Chia-Chi
 Mark Cheng as Wei-Ming
 Kong Tai-Chuen as Chiang
 Lung Fei		
 Tai Po as Chien
 Wu Ma as Police Chief

External links
 HKMD entry
 IMDb entry (note: year produced erroneously mentioned as 1983)
 HK cinemagic entry

1993 films
Taiwanese action films